The Women's 400m T13 had its competition held on September 11, with the first round at 18:30 and the Final on September 12, at 20:26.

Medalists

Results

References
Round 1 - Heat 1
Round 1 - Heat 2
Final

Athletics at the 2008 Summer Paralympics
2008 in women's athletics